Marat Safin defeated Harel Levy in the final, 6–2, 6–3 to win the men's singles tennis title at the 2000 Canadian Open. Levy became the first Israeli to reach a Master 1000 single final.

Thomas Johansson was the defending champion, but lost in the second round to Wayne Ferreira.

Seeds

  Andre Agassi (first round)
  Pete Sampras (quarterfinals)
  Magnus Norman (first round)
  Gustavo Kuerten (second round)
  Yevgeny Kafelnikov (quarterfinals)
  Thomas Enqvist (third round, retired)
  Lleyton Hewitt (second round)
  Marat Safin (champion)
  Àlex Corretja (withdrew)
  Nicolás Lapentti (first round)
  Nicolas Kiefer (second round)
  Juan Carlos Ferrero (third round)
  Franco Squillari (first round)
  Patrick Rafter (quarterfinals)
  Tim Henman (first round)
  Mark Philippoussis (first round)
  Nicolas Escudé (third round, retired)

Draw

Finals

Top half

Section 1

Section 2

Bottom half

Section 3

Section 4

External links
Draw
Qualifying Draw

Men's Singles